Events from the year 1990 in Taiwan, Republic of China. This year is numbered Minguo 79 according to the official Republic of China calendar.

Incumbents
 President – Lee Teng-hui
 Vice President – Lee Yuan-tsu
 Premier – Lee Huan, Hau Pei-tsun
 Vice Premier – Shih Chi-yang

Events

March
 16–22 March – Wild Lily student movement in Taipei.

April
 21 April – The opening of Taiwan Theater Museum in Yilan City, Yilan County.

June
 5 June – The Executive Yuan Academy passed the nomination of Lien Chan as a member and chairman of the Taiwan Provincial Government, and passed the nomination of Wu Dunyi as Mayor of Kaohsiung. Then, also asked the Taiwan Provincial Assembly and Kaohsiung City Council to exercise their right of consent.

September
 12 September – The signing of Kinmen Agreement between Red Cross Society of the Republic of China and Red Cross Society of China in Kinmen.

October
 8 October – The inauguration of the current Taipei City Council building at Xinyi District, Taipei.

December
 10 December – 27th Golden Horse Awards in National Theater and Concert Hall, Taipei.

Births
 24 February – Lu Chia-pin, badminton player
 17 April – Lei Chien-ying, archer
 29 May – Huang Ting-ying, track and road cyclist
 10 July – Lin Man-ting, football and futsal player
 7 October – Liao Kuan-hao, badminton player
 7 November - Bao Hsi-le, basketball player
 14 November – Chang Hao, sailor
 4 December – Cindy Yang, actress and model
 30 December – Beatrice Fang, actress

Deaths
 21 September – Jiang Fucong, educator and politician.
 14 December – Zhang Qun, former Premier.

References

 
Years of the 20th century in Taiwan